To Find a Man is a 1972 American comedy-drama film directed by Buzz Kulik and starring Pamela Sue Martin, Darren O'Connor, and Lloyd Bridges. It was entered into the 1972 Cannes Film Festival.

Plot
Rosalind McCarthy is a spoiled 16-year-old who returns home to New York City from boarding school for the holidays. She confides to a friend, Andy, that she might be pregnant.

They seek out the advice of Dr. Katchaturian, a pharmacist. Rosalind naively tries to induce a miscarriage by jumping, drinking castor oil, even douching with soda pop. Resigned to an abortion before a family vacation in Mexico, she needs money.

Andy tries to get some from the baby's father, Rick, a gigolo with whom Rosalind had a one-night stand. He fails, so he pawns a chemistry set, only to be mugged and robbed on the way home.

In desperation, Andy goes to Rosalind's father, pretending he needs to borrow money for someone he has impregnated. Frank McCarthy obliges, but when he concludes that Rosalind is the one who needs the abortion, he orders Andy never to return to their house. Dr. Hargrave performs the abortion, after which Rosalind cavalierly offers Andy sex as her way of a thank-you.

Cast
 Pamela Sue Martin as Rosalind McCarthy (as Pamela Martin)
 Darren O'Connor as Andy Elliott Morrison
 Lloyd Bridges as Frank McCarthy
 Phyllis Newman as Betty McCarthy
 Tom Ewell as Dr. Hargrave
 Tom Bosley as Dr. Katchaturian
 Miles Chapin as Pete
 Schell Rasten as Rick
 Antonia Rey as Modesta
 Vicki Sue Robinson

References

External links

1972 films
1972 comedy-drama films
1970s teen comedy-drama films
American comedy-drama films
American coming-of-age films
American independent films
Columbia Pictures films
Films about abortion
Films based on American novels
Films directed by Buzz Kulik
Films scored by David Shire
Films set in New York City
Films shot in New York (state)
Teenage pregnancy in film
1970s English-language films
1970s American films